Associazione Sportiva Bisceglie Calcio 1913, commonly referred to as Bisceglie, is an Italian association football club based in Bisceglie, Apulia.

-2018, it plays in Group C of Serie C, the third tier of Italian football.

History 
Associazione Sportiva Bisceglie Calcio 1913 was founded in 1913.

The club has played 4 seasons in Serie C and 12 in Serie C2.

Coppa Italia Dilettanti 
In the 2011–12 season the club won:
  Coppa Italia Dilettanti 2011–12, obtaining so the direct promotion to Serie D, beating 2–1 Pisa Sporting Club A.S.D., a team from Eccellenza Tuscany Group A.
 Coppa Italia Puglia.

Colors and badge 
The team's kit has black and blue stripes.

Honours 
Serie D:
 Winner (3): 1957,58, 1959–60, 1985–86
 Coppa Italia Dilettanti:
Champion (1): 2011–12
Regional Coppa Italia Apulia:
Winner (1): 2011–12

Current squad

References

External links 
 

Association football clubs established in 1913
Football clubs in Apulia
Serie C clubs
1913 establishments in Italy